Sara Simeoni (born 19 April 1953) is an Italian former high jumper, who won a gold medal at the 1980 Summer Olympics and twice set a world record in the women's high jump.

Biography
Sara Simeoni was born in Rivoli Veronese, in the province of Verona. She soon took up athletics, specialising in the high jump. Her first international result was at the 1971 European Championships in Helsinki, where she ended 9th with a 178 cm jump. Her first international success was at the 1976 in Montreal, where she won a silver medal, with a personal best of 1.91 m, and was beaten only by Rosemarie Ackermann's 1.93 m leap.

In August 1978, she set the new world record with 2.01 m in Brescia (this jump stood as a national record until Antonietta Di Martino jumped 2.02 in June 2007). Later in the same month she equalled it at Prague while winning the European title. In 1980, Simeoni set a new Olympic record of 1.97 m, when winning gold in Moscow. Simeoni was the only woman athlete not from a Communist country able to win an athletics gold medal in Moscow.

Simeoni struggled to regain her form in the following years, with a series of tendon injuries. At 1984 Olympics, Simeoni carried the Italian flag at the opening ceremony in Los Angeles. Here, she cemented her reputation as one of the greatest female high jumpers ever, in a thrilling duel with West German Ulrike Meyfarth. Simeoni managed to reach the 2 meters measure for the first time since 1978. The ageing Meyfarth, however, replied with a notable 2.02 m jump, and Simeoni won a silver medal.

Simeoni's other titles include two bronze medals at the European Championships and 25 national titles. Her jump of 2.01 m was the Italian record for women for 29 years. On 8 June 2007, Antonietta Di Martino jumped 2.02 m, establishing the new Italian record for women.

Sara Simeoni is widely considered one of the best Italian female athletes ever. She is married to her coach Erminio Azzaro. Their son Roberto Azzaro is also a high jumper.

Achievements

1Representing Europe

National titles
She won 25 national championships at individual senior level.

 Italian Athletics Championships
 High jump: 1970, 1971, 1972, 1973, 1974, 1975, 1976, 1977, 1978, 1979, 1980, 1982, 1983, 1985 (14)
 Pentathlon: 1972 (1)
 Italian Indoor Athletics Championships
 High jump: 1970, 1971, 1973, 1974, 1975, 1977, 1978, 1980, 1981, 1986 (10)

See also
 Female two metres club
 Women's high jump world record progression
 Women with most medals in high jump
 Italian sportswomen multiple medalists at Olympics and World Championships
 FIDAL Hall of Fame
 Italy national athletics team – Multiple medalists
 Italian all-time lists – High jump

References

External links
 

1953 births
Living people
Sportspeople from the Province of Verona
Italian female high jumpers
Olympic athletes of Italy
Athletes (track and field) at the 1972 Summer Olympics
Athletes (track and field) at the 1976 Summer Olympics
Athletes (track and field) at the 1980 Summer Olympics
Athletes (track and field) at the 1984 Summer Olympics
World record setters in athletics (track and field)
Olympic gold medalists for Italy
Olympic silver medalists for Italy
European Athletics Championships medalists
Medalists at the 1984 Summer Olympics
Medalists at the 1980 Summer Olympics
Medalists at the 1976 Summer Olympics
Olympic gold medalists in athletics (track and field)
Olympic silver medalists in athletics (track and field)
Mediterranean Games gold medalists for Italy
Athletes (track and field) at the 1975 Mediterranean Games
Athletes (track and field) at the 1979 Mediterranean Games
Universiade medalists in athletics (track and field)
World Athletics Championships athletes for Italy
Mediterranean Games medalists in athletics
Universiade gold medalists for Italy
Universiade silver medalists for Italy
Universiade bronze medalists for Italy
Medalists at the 1973 Summer Universiade
Medalists at the 1975 Summer Universiade
Medalists at the 1977 Summer Universiade
Medalists at the 1979 Summer Universiade
Medalists at the 1981 Summer Universiade
Italian Athletics Championships winners